Hayes Lauder (born 5 February 1977) is a former professional rugby league footballer who played for the Balmain Tigers and Wests Tigers.

References

1977 births
Living people
Australian rugby league players
Balmain Tigers players
Wests Tigers players
Rugby league second-rows
Rugby league props
Place of birth missing (living people)